Gamze Alikaya (born 1 January 1993) is a Turkish women's volleyball player.

She played for Galatasaray S.K. before she transferred to Eczacıbaşı VitrA for the 2018–19 season. She is a member of the Turkey women's national volleyball team.

Playing career

Club 
By end May 2018, Alikaya moved from her club Galatasaray S.K. to Eczacıbaşı VitrA for the 2018–19 Turkish Women's Volleyball League season.

Between 2012 and 2018, she took part at Women's CEV Cup with Galatasaray S.K.

International 
Alikaya played for the Turkey girls' youth (2008–2009) and the Turkey women's junior teams (22010-2011). She is a member of the Turkey women's national volleyball team,  She played at the 2014 World Grand Prix, 2015 European Championship, 2017 World Grand Prix, 2017 European Championship and currently takes part at the 2018 FIVB Volleyball Women's Nations League for Turkey.

References

External links
Player profile at Volleybox.net

Living people
1993 births
Volleyball players from Istanbul
Turkish women's volleyball players
Galatasaray S.K. (women's volleyball) players
Eczacıbaşı volleyball players
Turkey women's international volleyball players
21st-century Turkish sportswomen